Microrgyia is a monotypic moth genus in the subfamily Lymantriinae. Its only species, Microrgyia amazonum, is found in the Amazon basin. Both the genus and the species were first described by Felder in 1874.

References

Lymantriinae
Monotypic moth genera